Marjan Gorenc (born February 27, 1964 in Ljubljana, Yugoslavia) is a retired Slovenian professional ice hockey player.

Career

Club career
In 1983, Gorenc made his debut with HK Olimpija Ljubljana in the Yugoslav Ice Hockey League. He also played three seasons with HK MK Bled in the Slovenian Hockey League, before retiring in 2000.

International career
Gorenc represented both Yugoslavia and Slovenia in international competitions. He participated in the World Championships, and the 1984 Winter Olympics.

Coaching career
He coached HDD Olimpija Ljubljana from 2000-2002.

References

1964 births
Living people
HDD Olimpija Ljubljana players
Ice hockey players at the 1984 Winter Olympics
Olympic ice hockey players of Yugoslavia
Slovenian ice hockey coaches
Slovenian ice hockey left wingers
Sportspeople from Ljubljana
Yugoslav ice hockey left wingers